This Boy's Life is a 1993 American biographical coming-of-age drama film based on the memoir of the same name by author Tobias Wolff. It was directed by Michael Caton-Jones and stars Leonardo DiCaprio as Tobias "Toby" Wolff, Robert De Niro as Toby's stepfather Dwight Hansen, and Ellen Barkin as Toby's mother, Caroline. The movie marked the first time Leonardo DiCaprio and Robert De Niro ever collaborated. The film also features Chris Cooper, Carla Gugino, Eliza Dushku and Tobey Maguire's first credited appearance in a feature-length movie.

It was the first collaboration on-screen between Maguire and DiCaprio, who both later worked in Don's Plum and The Great Gatsby, and also the first collaboration on-screen between DiCaprio and De Niro, who both later worked in Marvin's Room, short film The Audition, and the upcoming film Killers of the Flower Moon.

Plot
In the 1950s, nomadic and flaky Caroline Wolff wants to settle down and find a decent man to provide a better home for herself and her son, Tobias "Toby" Wolff. She moves to Seattle, Washington and meets Dwight Hansen, a man who seemingly meets her goals. However, Dwight's true personality is soon revealed as being emotionally, verbally, and physically abusive to Toby while Caroline is away for a few weeks.

The marriage proceeds, and Caroline and Toby move into Dwight's home in Concrete, a small town near the north Cascades Mountains. Dwight's domineering personality is soon apparent, but Caroline remains with him, enduring several years of a dysfunctional relationship. During this time, Toby befriends a classmate named Arthur Gayle, a misfit at school and ambiguously gay. Toby wants to leave Concrete and live with his older brother, Gregory, (who lives on the East Coast with their father). Arthur wants to leave because he knows he will never fit in and that there is more to life than living in Concrete.  Toby plans to apply for scholarships at East Coast prep schools by submitting falsified school records. Meanwhile, Arthur and Toby's friendship becomes strained when Arthur accuses Toby of behaving more like Dwight. Arthur helps Toby to falsify his grade records. After numerous rejections, Toby is accepted by The Hill School in Pottstown, Pennsylvania near Philadelphia with a full scholarship.

Later, Caroline defends Toby from Dwight during a physically violent argument; they both leave Dwight and the town of Concrete.

Note: The real Dwight died in 1992. Caroline (Rosemary Wolff) remarried and moved to Florida. Arthur Gayle left Concrete and became a successful businessman in Italy. Dwight's children all married and lived in Seattle. Toby and his brother Geoffrey both became noted writers.

Cast
 Leonardo DiCaprio as Tobias "Toby" Wolff/“Jack”
 Robert De Niro as Dwight Hansen
 Ellen Barkin as Caroline Wolff Hansen
 Jonah Blechman  as Arthur Gayle
 Eliza Dushku as Pearl Hansen
 Chris Cooper as Roy
 Carla Gugino as Norma Hansen
 Zack Ansley as Skipper Hansen
 Tracey Ellis as Kathy
 Kathy Kinney as Marian
 Tobey Maguire as Chuck Bolger
 Michael Bacall as Terry Taylor
 Gerrit Graham as Mr. Howard
 Sean Murray as Jimmy Voorhees
 Lee Wilkof as Principal Skippy
 Bill Dow as Vice Principal
 Jen Taylor as Deputy O'Riley (uncredited)
 Deanna Milligan and Morgan Brayton as Silver Sisters

Production
Largely filmed in the state of Washington, the town of Concrete, Washington (where Tobias Wolff's teen years were spent with his mother and stepfather, Dwight), was transformed to its 1950s appearance for a realistic feel. Many of the town's citizens were used as extras, and all external scenes in Concrete (and some internal scenes, as well) were shot in and around the town, including the former elementary school buildings and the still-active Concrete High School building. Parts of the film were also shot in the La Sal Mountains in Utah.

Release

Box office
The film was released in limited release on April 9, 1993, and earned $74,425 that weekend; upon its wide release on April 23, the film opened at #10 at the box office and grossed $1,519,678. The film would end with a domestic gross of $4,104,962.

Critical reception
The film received mostly positive reviews; review aggregator website Rotten Tomatoes gave the film a 76% 'Fresh' rating from 37 critics, with an average rating of 6.4/10. The site's consensus states: "A harrowing, moving drama about a young boy, his single mother, and his abusive stepfather, This Boy's Life benefits from its terrific cast, and features a breakout performance from a young Leonardo DiCaprio." On Metacritic, where they give a 'normalized' score, the film has a 60/100.

Home media
This Boy's Life was released on VHS September 1, 1993 and on DVD May 13, 2003.

Soundtrack
The soundtrack of This Boy's Life used many songs from the 1950s and early 1960s. The main titles (filmed in Professor Valley, Utah) feature Frank Sinatra's version of "Let's Get Away from It All" from his 1958 album Come Fly with Me. Toby and his mother sing "I'm Gonna Wash That Man Right Outa My Hair" from the popular post-war musical South Pacific. However, most of the music reflects Toby's fondness for rock and roll and doo wop, including songs by Eddie Cochran, Frankie Lymon and the Teenagers, and Link Wray. Carter Burwell composed the film's pensive score, which featured New York guitarist Frederic Hand.

References

External links
 
 
 
 
 This Boy's Life film trailer at YouTube

1993 films
1990s coming-of-age drama films
1990s biographical drama films
American biographical drama films
American coming-of-age drama films
Biographical films about children
Drama films based on actual events
Films based on biographies
Films about domestic violence
Films about dysfunctional families
Films directed by Michael Caton-Jones
Films produced by Art Linson
Films set in Seattle
Films set in the 1950s
Films set in 1957
Films set in 1959
Films shot in Washington (state)
Films set in Washington (state)
Films scored by Carter Burwell
The Hill School
Films about the Boy Scouts of America
Films shot in Utah
Warner Bros. films
1993 drama films
Biographical films about writers
Films about mother–son relationships
1990s English-language films
1990s American films
Films with screenplays by Robert Getchell